The Diocese of the West is a diocese of the Orthodox Church in America (OCA). Its territory includes parishes, monasteries, and missions located in eight states in the Western United States – Arizona, California, Colorado, Hawaii, Montana, Nevada, Oregon, and Washington. The diocesan chancery is located in Los Angeles, California.

Benjamin (Peterson) was installed as Bishop of the West on October 2, 2007. He replaced Herman (Swaiko), who was also the OCA's ruling primate. Metr. Herman had served as the locum tenens of the diocese of San Francisco, Los Angeles and the West since the retirement of Bishop Tikhon (Fitzgerald) in November 2006. During a special diocesan assembly held on January 31, 2007, Bishop Benjamin of Berkeley was unanimously nominated to replace Bishop Tikhon as Diocesan Hierarch. Bishop Benjamin's name was submitted to the Holy Synod of Bishops of the OCA, who elected him as Hierarch during their spring session on March 20, 2007.

Bishop Benjamin had served as Chancellor of the Diocese of the West since January 2004, and had been the temporary Administrator of the diocese since Bishop Tikhon's retirement.

Deaneries 

The diocese is grouped geographically into six deaneries, each consisting of a number of parishes. Each deanery is headed by a parish priest, known as a dean. The deans coordinate activities in their area's parishes, and report to the diocesan bishop. The current deaneries of the Diocese of the West and their territories are:

 Missionary District – Arizona, California, Hawaii, Montana, Oregon, and Washington
 San Francisco Russian Missionary District Deanery – California
 Pacific Central Deanery – California
 Pacific Northwest Deanery – Oregon and Washington
 Pacific Southwest Deanery – Arizona, California, and Nevada
 Rocky Mountain Deanery – Colorado

References

External links 

 Official site
 Biography of Bishop Benjamin on oca.org

South
Eastern Orthodoxy in Arizona
Eastern Orthodoxy in California
Eastern Orthodoxy in Colorado
Eastern Orthodoxy in Hawaii
Eastern Orthodoxy in Montana
Eastern Orthodoxy in Nevada
Eastern Orthodoxy in Oregon
Eastern Orthodoxy in Washington (state)